Adrian Kappenberger (born 25 August 1996) is a Danish professional footballer who plays for Hobro IK, as a goalkeeper.

Career
Kappenberger began his career at lower level clubs, including Oure and Fredensborg BI, before joining FC Helsingør in 2017. In June 2018, he signed with Danish Superliga club Hobro IK. There, he mainly featured as a backup to starting goalkeeper Jesper Rask.

References

1996 births
Living people
Danish men's footballers
FC Helsingør players
SfB-Oure FA players
Fredensborg BI players
Hobro IK players
Danish Superliga players
Association football goalkeepers
People from Rudersdal Municipality
Danish 1st Division players
Danish 2nd Division players
Denmark Series players
Sportspeople from the Capital Region of Denmark